The 2012 Qatar Total Open was a professional women's tennis tournament played on hard courts. It was the 10th edition of the event. It took place at International Tennis and Squash complex in Doha, Qatar between 13 and 19 February 2012. It was upgraded from a Premier event to a Premier 5 event. Victoria Azarenka won the title after defeating Samantha Stosur 6–1, 6–2. Vera Zvonareva was the defending champion, but retired during her second round match against Monica Niculescu.

Seeds
The top eight seeds received a bye into the second round.

Draw

Finals

Top half

Section 1

Section 2

Bottom half

Section 3

Section 4

Qualifying

Seeds

Qualifiers

Draw

First qualifier

Second qualifier

Third qualifier

Fourth qualifier

Fifth qualifier

Sixth qualifier

Seventh qualifier

Eighth qualifier

References
 Main Draw
 Qualifying Draw

2012 WTA Tour
2012 Qatar Total Open - 1
2012 in Qatari sport